This is a list of number one singles on the Billboard Japan Hot 100 chart in Japan in 2015. The week's most popular songs in Japan, ranked by the Hanshin Corporation and based on radio airplay measured by Plantech and sales data as compiled by SoundScan Japan.

Chart history

References 

2015 in Japanese music
Japan Hot 100
Lists of number-one songs in Japan